Xysticus canadensis is a species of crab spider in the family Thomisidae. It is found in Russia, the United States, and Canada.

References

Thomisidae
Articles created by Qbugbot
Spiders described in 1934